Enolmis seeboldiella is a moth of the family Scythrididae. It was described by Ramon Agenjo Cecilia in 1951. It is found in Spain.

References

Scythrididae
Moths described in 1951